Artz House is a registered historic building in Dublin, Ohio, listed in the National Register on 1979-04-11.

Historic uses 
The Artz House is a single-family dwelling built by Harry Artz and his wife Sally Thomas around 1870.

References 

Houses on the National Register of Historic Places in Ohio
Houses in Franklin County, Ohio
National Register of Historic Places in Franklin County, Ohio
Dublin, Ohio